Solute carrier family 17 (vesicular glutamate transporter), member 6 is a protein that in humans is encoded by the SLC17A6 gene.

References

Further reading 

Human proteins